Cheekh (lit: 'Scream') was a 2019 Pakistani crime-drama television series created and produced by Fahad Mustafa and Dr. Ali Kazmi under their production house, Big Bang Entertainment. It features Saba Qamar and Bilal Abbas in leads while Aijaz Aslam, Maira Khan, Emmad Irfani and Azekah Daniel in supportive roles. The serial began on ARY Digital on January 5, 2019. The show was acclaimed by critics and viewer and it was one of the most successful show of ARY Digital at that time. Plot
Mannat (Saba Qamar), Haya (Azekah Daniel), and Nayab (Ushna Shah) are all close friends. Wajih (Bilal Abbas Khan), Yawer (Aijaz Aslam), Shayaan (Emmad Irfani), and Haya are siblings. Mannat is married to Shayaan.  Her in-laws are shown as quite wealthy. However, Nayab is poor. Her mother died and she lives with her father Ramzaan (Noor-ul-Hassan), greedy step-mother (Saima Qureshi) and her 2 step-sisters. Nayab gets murdered after a rape attempt and physical violence on the night of her friend Haya's engagement. Nayab is rushed to the hospital where she soon dies. As Nayab breathes her last, she indicates in her testimony before Mannat & the police the identity of her assailant by calling him 'Raja' (a nickname which the women in the family jokingly use for Wajih). Mannat - after hearing this, doesn't believes it at first until Wajih confesses it to her face himself. He tells her that on Haya's engagement night, he called Nayab on the terrace and indirectly asking her for sexual favours indicating that he wanted to use her physically and never commit, Nayab rejects him and tells him to stay away from her. Wajih's ego is hurt as no other girl has rejected him before and that now Mannat and everyone else will find out Wajih's true colours, he pushes Nayab from the rooftop. Mannat is shocked and devastated, she goes to the police station and files for F.I.R against him which creates havoc in Mannat's relationship with her In-Laws. Everyone breaks all ties with her forces her to take the case back except Shayan. Wajih falsely accuses Mannat of dating Haya's fiance, which Haya believes. Her fiance, seeing her having no trust in him nor her best friend, breaks off the engagement and parts his way from Haya forever, telling Shayan that Mannat is innocent and he should take her far away from all this.  As Mannat hires a lawyer and threatens the family to get Wajih hung to death, Wajih out of fear tells the truth to Yawer and begs him to save Wajih. Yawer, who is infertile and sees Wajih as his son, forgets his sins and promises to protect him no matter what. Mannat is shown to be pregnant and after a long time, smiles and sighs in peace and relief. After a series of court hearings, the case seemed to get into Mannat's hand so wajih uploads a video to the internet in which he lies saying that his sister in law;mannat asked him for sexual favours and after he rejected her, mannat blamed him for killing her friend and is defaming him in revenge. This video goes viral and mannat mocked publicly for having such intentions for her brother in law. As she was seen walking back to her home at night, wajih confronts and drives his car after her. She runs and falls on the ground, crying in pain while wajih sadly stares her helpless body and leaves. When mannat wakes up she finds herself in the hospital, realising that she has suffered a miscarriage. She gets completely hopeless and exhausted as decides to give up. But shayan who was also equally heartbroken, motivates her and she gets back to the court and her target. As wajih sees her back on track and his efforts failing, he starts blackmailing mannat's widow mother who lives alone. He locks her up and tells her stop mannat otherwise she will see her daughters dead body real soon. Mannat's mother out of fear, appears in the court and tells everyone a fake story of mannat being mentally unwell and a psycho since birth. Meaning, that whatever she says about the case is nothing but her own imagination. This results in the judge making the decision in wajih's favour and mannat is sent to the mental hospital. Shayan is heartbroken. When mannat's mother came to visit her and tried to explain that she only did this for her safety and will get her out of this, mannat ignores her completely and her mother leaves with a heavy heart. Wajih also comes and visits her apologizing for his actions and saying that he had to do this in order to save himself. Mannat gets mad at him and is calmed down by the staff in the asylum. A few days later, shayan comes and finally takes her out with him. Turns out, her mother has passed away. Mannat loses her senses and yells with a shivery voice that she was angry at her but didn't ever want this. Shayan and yawer's divorced wife who overheard wajih threatening mannat before and believes her,comfort her. Meanwhile, haya starts noticing red flags in wajih's behaviour and starts getting suspicious of him. A friend of wajih, sharigh who was drunk at the time nayab had fallen down,was accused by wajih in the court of being the rapist, out of revenge, tells hides haya behind the wall and gets wajih to admit everything. Haya is shocked and is shown crying and regretting how she treated mannat. Shayan confronts wajih and they start hitting one another. Wajih losing control over his actions as usual, pushes shayan so hard that he falls on a  glass table, causing intense bleeding mannat yelling for help. Wajih runs away and is shown crying in guilt of what he has done. Shayan soon dies in the hospital and mannat, haya, yawer are all shown mourning over his death. The police arrives and mannat tells them that it was just an accident and no one's responsible for it. Wajih confronts her and asks her the next day of why she gave the wrong statement. To which she answers saying that there's no way she will let a small statement make up for the loss of her respect,her child,her mother and her husband! She threatens him saying that as her iddat period will come to an end, she will bring him to a point where he will confess all his crimes himself in the court. Yawer is seen going through a stroke and is now paralyzed. He realises that this is his karma of supporting his brother's wrong doings. Mannat gives a statement in the police station saying that if anything will happen to her, it will be because of wajih. Therefore, wajih can't do anything to her. Taking advantage of this situation, mannat wears shayan's clothes to constantly remind him of what he did, locks him up in the store at night the way he locked her mother. She has also started collecting proofs to present in the court as she has reopened the case. Wajih goes the policeman who had unlawfully helped him previously after he paid him money. He refuses to help him saying that his brother's money was the reason why wajih used to brag and walk carelessly after committing such crimes. Now his brother is helpless. Disappointed, Wajih goes to his lawyer who agrees to take the case once again. Mannat is given permission by the court to present everything herself. She shows all her proofs, presents witnesses and lastly, in an heated argument with wajih where she twists the situation, wajih subconsciously spits the truth. Now no one could help wajih and he before being sentenced to death, is asked to give his last statements. He says that because he was never objected by yawer and given everything he demanded for, even if its wrong, and believe that no matter what he does, he will be backed up and saved, caused him to develop this sick mentality where he is extremely impulsive and selfish to a point where raping and murdering don't feel wrong nor bring him guilt. He is taken to the jail where haya, yawer and sharigh (now haya's husband) tearfully hug him before the police came and took him to he hanged. Mannat is seen smiling and is telling herself that whatever loss she had gone through just to see this day (wajih being hanged) were tests of Allah and if she would've kept quiet like everyone else,she would've lost dignity for herself in her eyes, and is satisfied supporting the oppressed! 

Cast
Saba Qamar as Mannat Shayan: Shayan's wife; Wajih, Yawer, and Haya's sister-in-law; Nayab's friend.
Bilal Abbas Khan as Wajih Taseer: Haya, Yawer, and Shayan's younger brother; Mannat's brother-in-law.
Aijaz Aslam as Yawer Taseer: Haya, Shayan, and Wajih's elder brother; Shewar's husband.
Emmad Irfani as Dr. Shayan Taseer: Mannat's husband; Wajih, Haya, and Yawar's brother; Shehwar's brother-in-law.
Maira Khan as Shehwar: Yawer's wife; Wajih, Shayaan, and Haya's sister-in-law.
Azekah Daniel as Haya Taseer: Mannat and Nayab's friend; Wajih, Yawar, and Shayaan's sister.
Ushna Shah as Nayab; Mannat and Haya's friend (Episodes 1–3).
Gul-e-Rana as Mannat's mother.
Noor-ul-Hassan as Ramzaan: Nayab's father; Shamsa's husband.
Saima Qureshi as Shamsa; Nayab's step-mother, Ramzaan's second wife.
Nayyar Ejaz as Inspector Aamir Khan.
Shabbir Jan as Lawyer.
Junaid Akhter as Asad: Haya's ex-fiancé; Mannat and Nayaab's friend.
Shehryar Zaidi as Sulaiman; Asad's father. (Episodes 9–11)
Birjees Farooqui as Asad's mother. (Episodes 9–10)
Asfar Khan as Wajih's driver.

Production
On being asked about why she chose the character of Mannat, Qamar told ARY News, "If I can connect with a character, I do it and If I don’t, I opt out." A Badar Mehmood's directorial and produced by Big Bang Entertainment, who had previously taken initiative against social issues through their serials Aisi Hai Tanhai, Mubarak Ho Beti Hui Hai, and Meri Guriya. In early October 2018, Qamar posted a video about being a part of the project. Bilal Abbas Khan was chosen for playing the antagonist, along with Azekah Daniel, Aijaz Aslam, Emmad Irfani as supporting cast, while Ushna Shah came in as an extended cameo role. It marks the second on-screen appearance of Khan, Daniel and Shah after Balaa. The first teaser of the drama, which was a narration, features some of the renowned actors and personalities, including Sharmeen Obaid Chinoy, Sanam Baloch, Sarwat Gilani, Maria Wasti, Sania Saeed, Shaista Lodhi, and Marina Khan.

Reception
The show became a popular serial in Pakistan after airing its first few episodes. It started off very well, averaging 6.4 TRPs. The first episode gained 7.5, while second episode gained 7.2. The role of Qamar and Khan was appreciated by critics. A reviewer from The Express Tribune wrote, "Her (Qamar)'s performance clearly stands out from other cast members, especially her dialogue delivery and outstanding facial expressions". Sheeba Khan of DAWN wrote about Khan's performance as praise-worthy while criticized the story, saying, "I fail to understand why writers insist on making mothers so weak". According to the review of The Nation, it was the third blockbuster serial for Khan after O Rangreza and Balaa. Critics also praised the character of Shayan, portrayed by Emmad Irfani. A reviewer from DAWN called him a "New Pakistani Hero".

Ratings

Soundtrack

The title song is Mere Maula,'' sung and composed by Asrar. The lyrics were written by Sabir Zafar.

Awards and nominations

References

External links
 Official website

Pakistani drama television series
Urdu-language television shows
ARY Digital original programming
2018 Pakistani television series debuts
2019 Pakistani television series debuts